Petra Overzier (born 8 March 1982) is a German professional badminton player. She is the first player originally from Germany to medal at the World Championships in women's singles category in 2006. Her younger sister Birgit Overzier is also a professional badminton player.

Achievements

World Championships
Women's Singles

European Junior Championships 
Girls' singles

Girls' doubles

IBF/BWF International 
Women's Singles

Women's doubles

Record against selected opponents 
Record against Year-end Finals finalists, World Championships semi-finalists, and Olympic quarter-finalists.

References

External links 
 

Living people
1982 births
Sportspeople from Cologne
German female badminton players